Nora Thompson Dean (July 3, 1907 – November 29, 1984), also known as Weenjipahkihelexkwe (modern Unami orthography: Weènchipahkihëlèxkwe), which translates as "Touching Leaves Woman" in Unami, was a member of the Delaware Tribe of Indians. As a Lenape traditionalist and one of the last fluent speakers of the southern Unami dialect of the Lenape language, she was an influential mentor to younger tribal members and is widely cited in scholarship on Lenape culture.

Early life
Nora Thompson was born ten miles east of Bartlesville, Oklahoma at Glen Oak, Oklahoma on July 3, 1907, to James H. and Sarah (Wilson) Thompson, both full-blood Delawares. She received her education in the Oklahoma Public Schools. She graduated from Midway School in 1921, as salutatorian, and from Dewey High School in 1925. Nora Thompson also had some nursing training and several university credits. In 1941 she married Charley Dean, who was also born and raised in northeastern Oklahoma.

Cultural revitalization efforts
Dean was raised in the traditional ways of her people, and she dedicated herself to keeping these alive. Throughout her adult life, she taught about the Lenape religious ceremonies, social functions, dances, craftwork, herbal medicines, and language. She was consulted by tribal members and numerous academic specialists, including anthropologists, linguists, historians, botanists, and ethnomusicologists.

In 1967 Dean founded a mail-order business, Touching Leaves Indian Crafts, through which she sold the traditional clothing of the Lenape and other items. Dean received awards for her craftwork, and in recognition of her work to promote the traditional ways of her Lenape people. These included commendations from the Oklahoma House of Representatives and the Governors of Oklahoma, Delaware, and Pennsylvania, and a Fellowship Award from the Archaeological Society of New Jersey.

In 1972, Dean participated in the Delaware Indian Symposium, which brought together scholars and tribal members from Oklahoma and Canada. She also presented at another Delaware cultural gathering in 1981.

In the later part of her life, Dean divided her time between artwork, working with students who came to her home to study, lecturing at universities, working at museums demonstrating Lenape artwork, working at different universities as a resource person, and preparing educational material for sale through her business.

Oklahoma governor George Nigh declared Dean an Oklahoma Ambassador of Good Will.

The year after her death, Dean's husband donated seeds of Lenape Blue Corn to the USDA, a variety of corn cultivated by the Lenape that was brought west by Dean's mother.

Unami language
Nora Thompson Dean created material including four Lenape Language Lessons; these sound recordings, as well as others made with Dean and other Lenape elders during the twentieth century, have been digitized to provide the voices of the Lenape Talking Dictionary, a project funded by the National Science Foundation. Dean's brother Edward Leonard Thompson (1904–2002) was the last living native speaker of Unami in the United States.

Death
Dean died on November 29, 1984 and is buried in the Delaware Indian Cemetery in Dewey, Oklahoma.

Notes

Selected bibliography

Works authored or co-authored by Nora Thompson Dean

 "Recipes of Indian Dishes." American Indian Crafts and Culture 7:8 (October 1973) 21.
 "A Personal Account of the Unami Delaware Big House Rite." Pennsylvania Archaeologist 48 (April 1978) 39-43. Co-authored by Jay Miller.
 "Delaware Indian Reminiscences." Bulletin of the Archaeological Society of New Jersey 35 (1978) 1-17.
 Lenape Language Lessons: Lessons One and Two. Dewey, OK: Touching Leaves Indian Crafts, 1979. (Tape and book.)
 Lenape Language Lessons: Lessons Three and Four. Dewey, OK: Touching Leaves Indian Crafts, 1980. (Tape and book.)
 Songs of the Lenape: Social Dance Songs, Tape 1, Dewey, OK: Touching Leaves Indian Crafts, 1980. (Tape and written insert.)
 Songs of the Lenape: War Dance and Social Dance, Tape 2, Dewey, OK: Touching Leaves Indian Crafts, 1982. (Tape and written insert)
 "A Baker's Dozen Do-Nots: Some Guidelines for Linguists, Anthropologists, and Their Related Tribal Members," Algonquian and Iroquoian Linguistics7:2 (1982)
 Touching Leaves Woman, "Some of the Ways of the Delaware Indian Women," in NOW Yellow Pages: A Feminist Guide to North Eastern Oklahoma, Bartlesville, Oklahoma, 1983. Also published in: Turtle Children: A Handbook for Delaware Children, Anadarko, OK: Delaware Tribe of Western Oklahoma, 1985.
 The Spiritual World of the Lenape or Delaware Indians, in Many Trails: Indians of the Lower Hudson Valley, Katonah, NY: The Katonah Gallery, 1983. (Exhibition catalog.)
 "Remembrances of the Big House Church," in Herbert C. Kraft, ed. The Lenape Indian: A Symposium. South Orange, NJ: Archaeological Research Center, Seton Hall University, 1984.
 "Lenape Funeral Customs," in Herbert C. Kraft, ed. The Lenape Indian: A Symposium. South Orange, NJ: Archaeological Research Center, Seton Hall University, 1984.
 Lenape Indian Cooking with Touching Leaves Woman, James Rementer, ed. Dewey, OK: Touching Leaves Indian Crafts, 1991.
 “Delaware Indian Religion: A Talk by Nora Thompson Dean.” James Rementer, ed. Bulletin of the Archaeological Society of New Jersey 50 (1995) 27-30.

Works for which Nora Thompson Dean was a consultant

 Adams, Richard C.  Legends of the Delaware Indians and Picture Writing, ed. by Deborah Nichols, Syracuse University Press, 1997.
 Cranor, Ruby. Talking Tombstones. Bartlesville OK: R.A. Cranor, 1983.
 Cranor, Ruby. Caney Valley Ghost Towns and Settlements. Bartlesville, OK: R.A. Cranor, 1985.
 Goddard, Ives.  Delaware Verbal Morphology:  A Descriptive and Comparative Study.  Garland Publishers, 1979
 Hilbert, Alfred G. "That Word 'Chemung' - What It Means"  The Chemung Historical Journal 20: 3 (March, 1975)
 Hill Jr., George A. Delaware Ethnobotany Newsletter of the Oklahoma Anthropological Society (March 1971).
 Howard, James H. "The Nanticoke-Delaware Skeleton Dance." American Indian Quarterly, (Spring 1975) 1-13.
 Howard, James H. "Ceremonial Dress of the Delaware Man." Bulletin of the Archaeological Society of New Jersey, 1976
 Howard, James H. Shawnee! The Ceremonialism of a Native American Tribe and Its Cultural Background OH: Ohio University Press, 1981.
 Kraft, Herbert C. "Archaeological Evidence for a Possible Masking Complex among the Prehistoric Lenape in Northwestern New Jersey." Bulletin of the New York State Archaeological Association 56 (1972) 1-11.
 Kraft, Herbert C. ed. A Delaware Indian Symposium, PA: The Pennsylvania Historical and Museum Commission, 1974.
 Kraft, Herbert C. The Archaeology of the Tocks Island Area NJ: Seton Hall University Museum, 1975.
 Kraft, Herbert C. The Lenape: Archaeology, History, and Ethnography, Newark, NJ: New Jersey Historical Society, 1986.
 Kraft, Herbert C., and Kraft, John T. The Indians of Lenapehoking. NJ: Seton Hall University Museum, 1985.
 Lederer Jr. Richard M. The Place-Names of Westchester County in New York. Harrison NY: Harbor Hill Books, 1978.
 Masthay, Carl. ed. Schmick's Mahican Dictionary, Philadelphia, PA: American Philosophical Society, vol. 197, 1991.
 Miller, Jay. "Kwulakan: The Delaware Side of Their Movement West." Pennsylvania Archaeologist (December, 1975)
 Miller, Jay. "Delaware Alternative Classifications," Anthropological Linguistics, 17: 9 (December, 1975) 434-444.
 Miller, Jay. "Delaware Anatomy." Anthropological Linguistics 19:4 (April 1977) 144-166.
 Newcomb Jr., William W. "The Culture and Acculturation of the Delaware Indians," Anthropological Papers 10 Ann Arbor, University of Michigan, 1956.
 Oestreicher, David M.  "Unmasking the Walam Olum:  A 19th-Century Hoax." Bulletin #49 of the Archaeological Society of New Jersey, 1994.
 Pearson, Bruce L.  "A Grammar of Delaware: Semantics, Morpho-Syntax, Lexicon, Phonology (dissertation)." (©1972 Bruce L. Pearson), Touching Leaves Co., 1988.
 Prewitt, Terry J. "Tradition and Culture Change in the Oklahoma Delaware Big House Community: 1867 - 1924" Contributions in Archaeology no. 9, University of Tulsa, 1981.
 Rementer, James A.  "A Lenape Family Named Thompson." Bulletin #49 of the Archaeological Society of New Jersey, 1994.
 Stewart, Ty. "Oklahoma Delaware Women's Dance Clothing." American Indian Crafts and Culture Magazine (1973).
 Teague, Margaret W. History of Washington County and Surrounding Area, Bartlesville, OK: Bartlesville Historical Commission, 1967.
 Twaddle, Andrew C. and Hessler, Richard M. A Sociology of Health. The C. V. Mosby Co., 1977.
 University Forum: The Delaware Indians Then and Now, a two-part educational video featuring Nora Thompson Dean and Terry J. Prewitt, hosted by Fran Reingold, University of Tulsa, 1980
 Weslager, C.A. "Name-Giving among the Delaware Indians." Names, Journal of the American Name Society (December 1971).
 Weslager, C.A. The Delaware Indians: A History. New Brunswick: Rutgers University Press, 1972.
 Weslager, C.A. Magic Medicines of the Indians NJ: Middle Atlantic Press, 1973.
 Weslager, C.A. "The Wolf, Turkey, and Turtle." Delaware Conservationist, 18: 4 (Winter 1974) 75.
 Weslager, C.A. Red Men on the Brandywine, 2nd ed. Wilmington, DE: Delmar Agency, Inc., 1976.
 Weslager, C.A. "New Castle, Delaware - And Its Former Names." Names, the Journal of the American Name Society, June, 1976
 Weslager, C.A. The Delaware Indian Westward Migration. NJ: Middle Atlantic Press, 1978.
 Weslager, C.A. "Lenape Ethnology from William Penn's Relation of 1683."  Bulletin of the Archaeological Society of Delaware18 New Series (1985)
 Williams, Joe. Bartlesville: Remembrances of Times Past, Reflections of Today. Bartlesville OK: TRW Reda Pump Division, 1978.

Further reading
 Cranor, Ruby, ed. Pioneer Profiles, Bartlesville OK: Washington County Historical Society, 1982.
 Klein, Barry T. ed. Reference Encyclopedia of the American Indian: Who's Who, 3rd edition, vol.. II, Rye, NY: Todd Publications, 1978.
 Kraft, Herbert C. "Plants, Herbs and the Healing Arts Among the Delaware Indians," The Herbarist, 51 (1985)
 "Nora Dean: She Lived Here When Legends Were A Way of Life." Oklahoma Character Magazine (June, 1983).
 Oestreicher, David M.  "In Search of the Lenape:  The Delaware Indians Past and Present."  Scarsdale Historical Society, Scarsdale, NY, 1995.
 Streznewski, Marylou. "A Real American Comes Home." Bucks County Panorama 12:12 (1970)
 Ward, Mary Sam. ed. Delaware Women Remembered Wilmington DE: The Modern Press, Inc., 1977.
 Weslager, C.A. "Name-Giving among the Delaware Indians." Names, Journal of the American Name Society (December 1971).
 Weslager, C.A. Magic Medicines of the Indians. NJ: Middle Atlantic Press, 1973.
 Weslager, C.A. and Rementer, James A. "American Indian Genealogy And A List of Names Bestowed By A Delaware Indian Name-Giver." The Pennsylvania Genealogical Magazine, 30:1 (1977)

External links
 Interview with Nora Thompson Dean by Katherine Red Corn (Osage Nation)
 Delaware Tribe of Indians
 Lenape Talking Dictionary

Delaware Tribe of Indians people
People from Bartlesville, Oklahoma
1907 births
1984 deaths
Native American writers
Native American artists
Native American language revitalization
People from Dewey, Oklahoma
20th-century Native Americans
20th-century Native American women
20th-century American women artists
20th-century American women writers
Writers from Oklahoma
Artists from Oklahoma